Littlehampton, is a seaside resort town and civil parish in the Arun District of West Sussex, England, on the east bank at the mouth of the River Arun. The following is a list of those people who were either born or live in Littlehampton, or had some important contribution to make to the town.



A
 George K. Arthur (1899–1985) actor and producer, winner of the Academy Award for Best Short Film in 1956 for the film The Bespoke Overcoat was born in Littlehampton

B
Ronnie Barker (1929–2005) actor comedian and writer, lived on South Terrace, Littlehampton
Paul Bence (1948–) former professional footballer for Brentford FC was born in Littlehampton
John Bigham, 1st Viscount Mersey (1840–1929) jurist and politician, died in Littlehampton
Benjamin Bonetti, Self Help Author, Hypnotherapist

C
Mary Chater, Music Advisor to the Girl Guides from 1949-1961, editor of 15 songbooks

D

Anne Dalgarno (1909–1980) politician, nurse and community leader, attended the Covent of the Holy Family, Littlehampton
Delirious? (Active years:1992–2009) christian rock band formed in Littlehampton

F
Ian Fleming (1908–1964) author, journalist and naval intelligence officer helped found No. 30 Commando unit, which was based in Littlehampton in 1944

G
Alan Gammon (1955–) mayor of Littlehampton 2008–2009 and 2011–2012
Nick Gibb (1960–) politician, Member of Parliament (MP) for Bognor Regis and Littlehampton. First elected to the seat in 1997 and has remained MP for the constituency since
Benjamin Gray (1810–1879) born in Littlehampton and founded the town of the same name in Adelaide Hills, Australia in 1849
Will Green (1973–) rugby union footballer who played at prop for Wasps and Leinster was born in Littlehampton

H
Michael Harbottle (1917–1997) Army officer, cricketer and peace campaigner was born in Littlehampton
Edwin Harris (1891–1961) cricketer for Sussex County Cricket Club was born in Littlehampton
Stanley Holloway (1890–1982) actor, died in Littlehampton
Amelia Frances Howard-Gibbon (1826–1874) children's book illustrator was born in Littlehampton
Cicely Hale (1884-1981) suffragette, health visitor, author. A plaque is dedicated to her in Marina Gardens, Littlehampton

J
Robert James (–1944) Army officer, born in Norfolk Road, Littlehampton

L
Joan Mary Last (1908–2002) music educator, author and composer, born in Littlehampton

N
Mary Neal (1860–1944) folk dance revivalist, suffragist and social worker, lived in Littlehampton 1925–1940

O
Paul O'Grady (1955–) comedian, television presenter, actor, writer and radio DJ lived in Littlehampton for a time

Q
Jeffrey Quill (1913–1996) aviator and test pilot was born in Littlehampton

R
Frederick Ravenhill (1837–1897) cricketer for Sussex County Cricket Club was born in Littlehampton
Albert Reed (1846–1931) cricketer for Sussex County Cricket Club died in Littlehampton
Anita Roddick (1942–2007) founder of The Body Shop was born in Littlehampton and established the Body Shop headquarters in the town.
Francis Rowe (1864–1928) cricketer for Essex County Cricket Club died in Littlehampton

S
John A. Scott (1948–) English-Australian poet, novelist and academic was born in Littlehampton

T
Paul Tanqueray (1905–1991) photographer was born in Littlehampton
Ben Thatcher (1988–) drummer in Royal Blood attended Littlehampton Community School

See also
 List of people from Sussex

References 

Littlehampton

List of notable people from Littlehampton
Lists of people by place in the United Kingdom